Chionodes stefaniae is a moth in the family Gelechiidae. It is found in Ecuador, where it has been recorded from the Galapagos Islands.

Etymology
The species is named in honour of Stefania Bertoli-Schmitz.

References

Chionodes
Moths described in 2007
Moths of South America